Haseri Asli (9 March 1974) is a Brunei athlete, who competed at the 2000 Summer Olympic Games in the Men's 100m. He finished 8th in his heat and failed to advance.

References

1974 births
Living people
Bruneian male sprinters
Olympic athletes of Brunei
Athletes (track and field) at the 2000 Summer Olympics
Place of birth missing (living people)